Gonzalo Javier Herrera (born 14 March 1997) is an Argentine professional footballer who plays as a defender.

Career
Herrera, having joined from Huracán in 2017, made the breakthrough into Atlanta's senior set-up during the 2017–18 season in Primera B Metropolitana, with manager Francisco Berscé selecting him to start in fixtures against Comunicaciones and San Telmo in April 2018. He subsequently returned to the club's reserves, before reappearing for a Copa Argentina loss to Arsenal de Sarandí in April 2019.

Career statistics
.

References

External links

1997 births
Living people
Place of birth missing (living people)
Argentine footballers
Association football defenders
Primera B Metropolitana players
Club Atlético Atlanta footballers